The untitled ninth studio album  by American rapper Nas, commonly referred to eponymously as Nas, or simply Untitled, was released on July 15, 2008 by The Jones Experience and Def Jam Recordings. Its original title Nigger was omitted due to controversy surrounding the racial epithet. The album is distinguished for its political content, diverse sources of production, and provocative subject matter. The album features guest appearances from Chris Brown, Keri Hilson, Busta Rhymes, and The Game, among others.

The album debuted at number one on the US Billboard 200, becoming Nas' fifth to do so, and was certified gold by the Recording Industry Association of America (RIAA) for shipments of over 500,000 copies in the United States. Upon its release, the album received generally positive reviews from critics.

Background

Title controversy
The original title of the album, Nigger, was mentioned by Nas several times, as well as on an October 12, 2007, performance at the Roseland Ballroom in New York City where he announced the title and release date. Def Jam made no comment on the title. This was similar to attempts to name his 2006 album, eventually titled Hip Hop Is Dead, to both Nigga and Hip Hop Is Dead... The N. On May 19, 2008, it was confirmed that Nas changed the name of the album to an untitled one (although on the iTunes Store, the album is self-titled), stating that "the people will always know what the real title of this album is and what to call it." The cover of the album depicts the back of a shirtless Nas with flagellation scars forming the shape of the letter N, a reference to the racial slur and how slaves were tortured in the United States. Fort Greene, Brooklyn assemblyman Hakeem Jeffries requested New York's Comptroller Thomas DiNapoli to withdraw $84 million from the state pension fund that has been invested into Universal and its parent company, Vivendi, if the album's title was not changed.

L.A. Reid, chairman of Def Jam at the time, confirmed that the label fully backed Nas and his decision on naming his album. The album's original title received support from Eminem, Ice Cube, Jay-Z, Bishop Lamont, Alicia Keys, LL Cool J, Rev Run, Common, Akon, Method Man, Lupe Fiasco, David Banner, GZA, and Melle Mel, while receiving criticism from 50 Cent, Will Smith, Al Sharpton, Bill O'Reilly, Oprah Winfrey, Reverend Jesse Jackson and the NAACP.

Production
Production credits for the album include stic.man of Dead Prez, DJ Green Lantern, Polow da Don, Salaam Remi, DJ Toomp, Stargate, Cool & Dre, Game, Mark Ronson, Mark Batson, Jay Electronica, J. Myers, Dustin Moore, Calvin McDaniel and Eric Hudson. Early reports of production mentioned that No I.D., DJ Khalil, Jermaine Dupri, Chris Webber and The Hitmen were contributing tracks, but their tracks failed to make the final cut for the album. DJ Premier stated in a 2009 interview with HipHopDX that he sent in a beat for Nas that Nas did not end up using on this album.

Guest artists featured on the album are Busta Rhymes, Keri Hilson, Game, Chris Brown, The Last Poets, Eban Thomas, Mulatto and Mykel. Although Jay Electronica produced the introductory track, he does not have a verse on the album, as previously stated by Nas.

Release and promotion
Nas released a mixtape with DJ Green Lantern titled The Nigger Tape on June 9, 2008. The mixtape, which was released through NasIndependenceDay.com, features three songs that were later included on the album, as well as various unreleased tracks. In July 2008, it was announced that apparel company Fila will be providing financial support for the album's marketing for one year. In exchange, Nas will wear Fila sneakers at his shows.

Singles
Prior to the release of the untitled album, Nas released a music video for "Be a Nigger Too", a song rumored to be the first single. In late June, Nas told Billboard magazine that "Be a Nigger Too" would not even be on the album because of sample clearance issues. During the same week, Nas released "Hero", the album's first official single. The song features a chorus sung by Keri Hilson, a beat produced by Polow da Don and lyrics about the music industry's stranglehold on artistry. The Game announced on BET's 106 & Park that "Make the World Go Round" is the next single of the album, which was debuted in November 2008. Nas has also released videos for "Sly Fox" and "Y'all My Niggas",  however he does not appear in either of them.

Critical reception
Upon its release, the album received generally positive reviews from music critics, based on an aggregate score of 71/100 from Metacritic. Entertainment Weekly credited the album for its maturity as well as the album's ability to keep the listeners guessing. Andy Greenwald credits Nas, saying "In a summer of "Lollipop", it's good to hear a complicated record that doesn't shy from grown-up ambition." The album received a 4.5 mic rating from The Source magazine. The Independents Andy Gill gave it 5 out of 5 stars and described it as "probably the most politically oriented rap album since the days of Public Enemy and The Disposable Heroes of Hiphoprisy". In contrast, Los Angeles Times writer Jeff Weiss gave the album 2 out of 4 stars and wrote unfavorably of Nas's lyrics, perceiving his themes as hypocritical and inconsistent.

Despite calling its production "sporadically successful and widely uneven", Slant Magazine's Jimmy Newlin gave the album 3½ out of 5 stars and commended Nas's lyricism, calling its lyrics "all terrific". Jody Rosen of Rolling Stone gave the album 4 out of 5 stars and called it a "sprawling, furious, deeply ambivalent theme album about institutional racism, the failures of black leadership and the pathologies and promise of early-21st-century African-American life". USA Todays Elysa Gardner gave it 3 out of 4 stars and wrote "Nas reconfirms his status as one of rap’s most deft, thoughtful rhymers and his knack for trenchant, defiant commentary". On December 3, it was announced that the album had been nominated for the Grammy Award for Best Rap Album, but it ended up losing to Lil Wayne's Tha Carter III (2008).

Commercial performance
The album debuted at number one on the Billboard 200 album charts selling 187,078 copies in the first week of release. On September 11, 2008, the album was certified gold by the Recording Industry Association of America (RIAA) for sales of over 500,000 copies in the United States.

Track listing

Samples
"Queens Get the Money" contains samples from "Summer '78 (Instrumental)" by Yann Tiersen.
"You Can't Stop Us Now" contains interpolations from "Message from a Blackman" by The Whatnauts.
"N.I.G.G.E.R. (The Slave and the Master)" contains samples from "We're Just Trying to Make It" by The Persuaders.
"Black President" contains samples from "I Wonder If Heaven Got A Ghetto" by 2Pac and speeches from Barack Obama.

Personnel

Nasir Jones –  executive producer
Antonio "L.A." Reid –  executive producer
A. Saleh –  executive producer, A&R, management
Chris Gehringer –  mastering
Terese Joseph –  A&R administration
Leesa D. Brunson –  A&R coordination
Shakir Stewart –  A&R for Def Jam
Shari Bryant –  marketing
N. Jones –  management
Kenny Meiselas ESQ –  legal representation
Paul Rothenberg ESQ –  legal representation
Tavon Sampson –  art direction and design
Mieeno Peluce –  cover photography
Tavon Sampson –  cover illustration and design
Eric Altenburger –  cover illustration and design
Carol Corless –  package production
Deborah Mannis-Gardner for DMG Clearances, Inc –  sample clearance agent
Michael Seltzer –  business affairs
Antoinette Trotman –  business affairs
Ian Allen –  business affairs
Corbis – booklet images
Getty Images – booklet images

Charts

Weekly charts

Year-end charts

Certifications

Release history

References

External links
 

2008 albums
Nas albums
Albums produced by Cool & Dre
Albums produced by DJ Green Lantern
Albums produced by DJ Toomp
Albums produced by Eric Hudson
Albums produced by Polow da Don
Albums produced by Salaam Remi
Albums produced by Stargate
Albums produced by Mark Batson
Albums produced by Mark Ronson
Albums produced by Jay Electronica
Albums recorded at Electric Lady Studios
Def Jam Recordings albums
Obscenity controversies in music